Anna Karolína Schmiedlová (born 13 September 1994) is a Slovak tennis player.

She has won three singles titles on the WTA Tour, one singles title on the WTA Challenger Tour as well as 12 singles titles on the ITF Circuit. On 12 October 2015, she reached her best singles ranking of world No. 26.

Her younger sister, Kristína Schmiedlová, ended her professional tennis career at the age of 21.

Career

2013: Grand Slam and top-100 debut
Schmiedlová qualified for her first Grand Slam tournament at the French Open.

After Wimbledon, she reached the final of the $100,000 tournament in Biarritz, and lost to Stephanie Vogt in three sets.

She reached the top 100 for the first time with a ranking of world No. 97.

2014: French Open third round
In May, Schmiedlová won the Empire Slovak Open in Trnava. She defeated the defending champion Barbora Záhlavová-Strýcová in the final. The following week, she reached the final of the Prague Open, losing to Britain's Heather Watson in straight sets.

At the French Open, Schmiedlová defeated Zheng Jie in the first round and surprised the former world No. 1, Venus Williams, with a victory in three sets in round two. In the third round, she lost to Garbiñe Muguruza in straight sets.

2015: Breakthrough and first WTA Tour title
In February, she reached her first WTA final at the Rio Open, losing to Sara Errani in straight sets.
In April, she won her first WTA title at the Katowice Open, where she defeated Camila Giorgi in the final. She won her second WTA title at the Bucharest Open, where she defeated Errani in the final.

At the Wuhan Open, Schmiedlová scored her first top-10 victory, and hence the biggest win of her career, by coming upsetting former world No. 1, Caroline Wozniacki, in three sets in the second round.

2016: Major slump, out of the top 100
Schmiedlová commenced season at the Brisbane International where she lost in the first round to Varvara Lepchenko. Schmiedlová won her first match of the season at the Apia International Sydney by beating sixth seed Timea Bacsinszky in the first round. She was heavily defeated in the second round by qualifier Monica Puig. Seeded 27th at the Australian Open, Schmiedlová lost in the first round to Daria Kasatkina.

2018: Third WTA title, return to top 100
The Slovakian, ranked 132 in the world before this win in Bogotá, beat Lara Arruabarrena in the final. It was her first title since 2015 and resulted in her return to the top 100.

2020: First third-round appearance at the French Open in six years

Schmiedlová kicked off her season at the Brisbane International where she lost to Marta Kostyuk in the second round of qualifying. At Hobart, she was defeated in the first round of qualifying by Nina Stojanović. At the Australian Open, she lost her first-round match to sixth seed Belinda Bencic.

Playing in the Fed Cup tie versus Great Britain, Schmiedlová helped Slovakia win 3–1 by beating Heather Watson and Harriet Dart. Playing at the Mexican Open, Schmiedlová was defeated in the first round by Anastasia Potapova. Coming through qualifying at the Monterrey Open, Schmiedlová beat Venus Williams in the first round. She then lost in the second round to ninth seed and eventual finalist, Marie Bouzková. A week later, competing at a $25k tournament in Irapuato, Mexico, she was defeated in the first round by eighth seed Renata Zarazúa.

In August, Schmiedlová played at the TK Sparta Prague Open. Seeded 24th, she reached the quarterfinal round where she lost to second seed and eventual finalist Elisabetta Cocciaretto. In the leadup to the French Open, Schmiedlová played the İstanbul Cup and made it to the second round where she was defeated by Aliaksandra Sasnovich. 

At the French Open, Schmiedlová beat 2002 finalist and former world No. 1, Venus Williams, in straight sets in the first round. In the second, she upset tenth seed and former world No. 1, Victoria Azarenka, to reach the third round for the first time since 2014. But her run ended there with a straight-sets loss to qualifier and eventual semifinalist, Nadia Podoroska.

Performance timelines

Only main-draw results in WTA Tour, Grand Slam tournaments, Fed Cup/Billie Jean King Cup and Olympic Games are included in win–loss records.

Singles
Current after the 2023 Indian Wells Open.

Doubles

WTA career finals

Singles: 5 (3 titles, 2 runner-ups)

WTA 125 tournament finals

Singles: 1 (title)

ITF Circuit finals

Singles: 18 (12 titles, 6 runner–ups)

Doubles: 4 (4 runner–ups)

Junior Grand Slam tournament finals

Girls' singles: 1 (runner–up)

Wins over top-10 players

Notes

References

External links

 
  
 
 
 
 
  

1994 births
Living people
Sportspeople from Košice
Slovak female tennis players
Olympic tennis players of Slovakia
Tennis players at the 2016 Summer Olympics